Kawkhali is an upazila of Pirojpur District in the Division of Barisal, Bangladesh.

Geography 
It has 13,763 households and a total area of 79.64 km2.

Demographics 
According to the 1991 Bangladesh census, Kawkhali had a population of 70,347, of whom 37,391 were aged 18 or older. Males constituted 50.46% of the population, and females 49.54%. Kawkhali had an average literacy rate of 50.4% (7+ years), compared to the national average of 32.4%.

Administration
Kawkhali Upazila is divided into five union parishads: Amrajuri, Chirapara Parshaturia, Kawkhali, Sayna Raghunathpur, and Shial Kati. The union parishads are subdivided into 45 mauzas and 59 villages.

Kawkhali town 
Kawkhali is a small town and its communication depends on rivers and roads.  It has a launch & steamer station which dates from the British period. The Gabkhan Channel starts from Kawkhali near the village of Ashoa. On it many ships run from Mongla seaport to Dhaka.

See also 
Upazilas of Bangladesh
Districts of Bangladesh
Divisions of Bangladesh

References 

Upazilas of Pirojpur District